Salam Aodeh al-Maliki is an Iraqi politician and was the Minister for Transport in the Iraqi Transitional Government from May 2005 to May 2006.

In August 2005 he banned the sale of alcohol at Baghdad Airport, saying it gave visitors a bad first impression of Iraq.

References

Government ministers of Iraq
Iraqi Shia Muslims
Living people
Year of birth missing (living people)
Place of birth missing (living people)
21st-century Iraqi politicians